The Burke Special is a TV series broadcast on BBC1 in the United Kingdom from 15 June 1972 to 13 May 1976.

The host was James Burke. The show had a "circus" format, with Burke on a radio microphone walking around interacting with a studio audience that surrounded him on three sides.

The editor for all episodes was Michael Blakstad. Producers were John M. Mansfield and Martin Freeth.

Series One
15 June 1972 to 27 July 1972 (7 episodes of 30 mins each).

Series Two
8 March 1973 to 19 April 1973 (7 episodes of 30 mins each) at 8.30 pm to 9 pm on BBC1.

Thursday 8 March 1973
"Every minute of the day things are happening that will, sooner or later, change our lives. They're like parts of a jigsaw.It's only when the picture comes together that you know if you like it or not.It used to be you could afford to wait and see. Not anymore. Tomorrow comes too fast. That's why this programme puts the picture together ahead of time."

James Burke starred on the front cover of the Radio Times and had his futurologist cover story on page 6.

Series Three
21 June 1973 to 26 July 1973 (6 episodes of 30 mins each).

90-minute Burke Special - 3 August 1973

Series Four
21 March 1974 to 6 June 1974, excluding 2 May 1974 (10 episodes of 30 mins each).

Series Five
8 April 1976 to 13 May 1976 (6 episodes of 30 mins each) at 8.30 pm to 9 pm on BBC1.

Archive status
With the exception of Series Five, which reportedly exists complete, almost none of the programmes has been retained.

References

External links

1972 British television series debuts
1976 British television series endings
1970s British documentary television series
BBC television documentaries
British television documentaries
English-language television shows